The Volkswagen Passat (B1) is a large family car produced by Volkswagen in West Germany from 1973 to 1981.

B1 in Europe 
The original Volkswagen Passat was launched in 1973. The body types offered originally were two- and four-door fastback sedans (that were discontinued in 1981). These were joined in January 1975 by identically profiled three- and five-door hatchback versions. Externally all four shared a modern design, styled by the Italian designer Giorgetto Giugiaro. In essence, the first Passat was a fastback version of the mechanically identical Audi 80 sedan, introduced a year earlier. While the Audi 80 was nominated Car of the Year by the European motor press in 1973, they considered the Passat a facelifted version of the Audi and thus ineligible for the 1974 competition. The Passat became Wheels magazine's Car of the Year for 1974, however. A five-door station wagon/estate was introduced in 1974; the same car was available with Audi badging in many markets.

The Passat was one of the most modern European family cars at the time and was intended as a replacement for the aging Volkswagen Type 3 and Type 4. The platform serving it and the Audi 80 was named B1. In Europe, the Passat was equipped with either two rectangular, two round  units, or quadruple round  headlights depending on specification.

The Passat originally used the four-cylinder OHC 1.3 L and 1.5 L (with either 75 or 85 PS, 55 or 63 kW or 74 or 84 hp) petrol engines developed by Audi and also used in the Audi 80 -longitudinally mounted with front-wheel drive, in Audi tradition, with either a four-speed manual transmission or three-speed automatic. It had a MacPherson strut front suspension with a solid axle/coil spring setup at the rear.

The SOHC 1.5 was enlarged to 1.6 L in August 1975 with unchanged power ratings and slightly higher torque ratings. In July 1978 the Passat Diesel became available, equipped with the VW Golf's  1.5 L Diesel, followed in February 1979 (at the AutoRAI) by the Passat GLI with a fuel-injected version of the 1.6 L engine.

The whole range received a facelift in summer 1977 (model year 1978 - launched during 1978 outside of Europe), featuring an interior upgrade including a new dashboard and subtly revised styling including repositioned indicators and depending on model, either four round or two rectangular headlights. The objective, according to the manufacturer, was to differentiate the VW version from the mechanically similar Audi 80. Inside was a restyled dashboard in the style of the Golf, with the radio and heating controls now mounted centrally, one above the other, in a single unit alongside the principal dials. Engine mountings, the gearbox, and the exhaust system were modified in order to reduce interior noise, and comfort was also improved by changes to the springing and shock absorbers. The car's wheels were increased in size, and at the back, there was a stronger anti-roll bar. Right-hand-drive versions retained the original dashboard.

Export markets

North America 

In North America, the car was called the Volkswagen Dasher. The three- and five-door hatchback and a station wagon model were launched in North America for and during the 1974 model year. North American cars were equipped with single DOT standard headlights.

In 1978 the Dasher received a facelift along the lines of the European Passat, with quad sealed beam headlights and big polyurethane covered bumpers. The trim was also upgraded and the ride softened. 1979 saw the introduction of the 1.5 L diesel engine, which produced 48 PS (35 kW) in the 1130 kg (2500 lb) car. This version was not available as an Audi. 0–100 km/h time for the Diesel was 19.4 seconds, 6.2 seconds slower than the gasoline (petrol) engine. All gasoline engines were dropped for North America in 1981 in preparation for the next generation.

Australia

In Australia, the Passat was Wheels magazine's Car of the Year in 1974 and the car was assembled locally (CKD) from 1974 until 1977. It went on sale in February 1974, as a 2-door 1300 and a four-door 1500 (also available as a wagon beginning in May 1974). The smaller engine produces , while the bigger one offered . An automatic transmission was available on the larger engine, which was joined by a  two-door 1500 TS version in May. The Passat immediately outsold the Beetle in the Australian market, although the T2 Transporter still sold more than Volkswagen's entire passenger car lineup. In 1976 Nissan took over Volkswagen's Australian operations and kept assembling the entire lineup, including the Passat. The two-door models were discontinued, with the LS sedan and wagon now equipped with a 1.6-liter engine. Nissan assembly only lasted until March 1977, when the entire range became fully imported.

The fully imported 1977 Passat GLS had a  1588 cc engine and was originally only available as a two- or four-door sedan, at a sizable cost increase compared to the previous year. In spite of promises to keep up existing sales volumes, Passat volumes dropped by more than 70 percent. Sales dropped by another 70 percent in 1978, to 356 cars. In February 1979 the 1977 facelift model finally arrived, also heralding the introduction of the five-door hatchback bodywork, accompanied by the wagon. The 1.5 L diesel arrived in December 1979; sales in 1979 continued to freefall and only 90 cars were delivered. Originally available with inline-four petrol engines only the comparably successful 1.5 L diesel remained after late 1980. Sales tripled in 1980 and crept up to 287 in 1981, the last year new Volkswagen passenger cars were imported to Australia. The diesel model was available as a wagon or five-door hatchback (called "sedan"). Another 80 examples of the 1981 Passat Diesel were sold from existing stock in 1982.

South Africa
In South Africa the Passat was sold with two- or four-door saloon bodywork, as well as the five-door Variant model. The two-door was only marketed as the upscale "LS Coupé", near the top of the price range. Equipment levels were L, LS, and later the LS de luxe. 1.3 or 1.6 L engines were available. For 1977 the five-door hatchback version arrived, badged "Passat LX." Some other light modifications were also carried out for 1977, slight improvements to the ventilation system, more equipment, and new hubcaps for the LS and LX versions. As in South America, the facelift model received the Audi 1980's front-end treatment. This facelift appeared in August 1978 and also included a variety of noise reduction modifications and suspension improvements, including wider wheels.

B1 in Brazil 

In Brazil, the Passat B1 was produced from 1974 until 1988, originally with the 1.5-liter gasoline engine. A 1.6 was added with the 1976 introduction of the sportier TS 1.6 version, which received twin headlights. Since the Audi 80 was not marketed in Brazil, its front-end treatment was applied to the Passat in a facelift for 1979. Originally only available as a two or four-door fastback sedan, a three-door hatchback option was added in July 1976. During its long life cycle many improvements from the B2 platform were introduced, like its 1.6 and 1.8-liter engines and a five-speed gearbox. A second, Brazil-specific face-lift in 1983 brought quadruple rectangular headlights. The sporting TS 1.6 was later upgraded with a bigger engine, as the Passat GTS 1.8 Pointer. For export only Volkswagen's 1.6 L diesel four-cylinder engine was also installed.

As a part of an overall export push by Volkswagen do Brasil (VWB), 170,000 "Passat LSE" were also built between 1983 and 1988 specifically for export to Iraq. These cars received various upgrades to suit Iraqi conditions, such as a protection plate for the engine, a stronger radiator, and standard air conditioning, and were bartered for oil which was transferred to Petrobras. As Petrobras' oil reserves grew larger than necessary, VWB found themselves with a large stock of Iraqi-spec cars that they were unable to export. In July 1986 local sales of these leftovers began. Despite being fitted with the old 72 PS 1.6 L MD270 engine and a four-speed transmission rather than the more powerful AP600 and the five-speed unit used in current Brazilian cars, the LSE was an unexpected success in the Brazilian market.

The Passat represented a break with Volkswagen do Brasil's rear-engined, air-cooled traditions. It did well on introduction, being a much more modern car than the rest of the VWB lineup as well as the Ford Corcel, its closest competitor. After the introduction of the B2 Santana in 1984, however, the Passat began to show its age. The Passat continued to be produced until 1988, by which time a total of 676,819 Passats had been built in Brazil.

Technical Data

References 

Passat B1
Cars introduced in 1973

1980s cars
Italdesign vehicles
Station wagons